Wachipa (Nepali वाचिपा)is a typical Kirat Rai People dish made with rice, minced chicken, and powder made out of burnt feathers of a chicken. The powder gives a unique bitter taste. Vegetarian wachipa is made by replacing meat with leaves or flowers of a plant called Damlapa, which is also bitter. It is eaten on special occasions. It is believed that consumption of wachipa cures body aches. It is called Wamik in Lohorung.

See also
 Pokhemma
 List of Nepalese dishes

References

Nepalese cuisine